Ayas may refer to:

Ayas
 Ayas(आयस), Sanskrit for metal, see history of metallurgy in the Indian subcontinent
 Ayas, Adana, the ancient city of Aegeae and medieval Ajazzo or Laiazzo, now Yumurtalık, Adana Province, Turkey
 Ayas, Aosta Valley, a comune in the Aosta Valley region of north-western Italy
 Ayas (club) Armenian nautical research club
 Ayas (film), 2013

Ayaş
 Ayaş, Ankara, a district of Ankara Province, Turkey
 Ayaş, Mersin, a village of Mersin Province in Turkey, close to Kızkalesi 
 Ayaş Tunnel, railway tunnel under construction in Ayaş, Ankara, which will be Turkey's longest when completed